Anthony Muleta (born January 31, 1986) is a French rugby union player, who plays as a hooker for RC Toulonnais .

Career 
 Since 2007 : RC Toulon

Honours 
 Pro D2 Champions : 2008

See also 
Rugby in France

References

External links 
  Player profile at lequipe.fr
  Statistics at itsrugby.fr

French rugby union players
Rugby union hookers
1986 births
RC Toulonnais players
Living people